Jordi Blom (born 5 June 2002) is a Dutch football player. He plays as a winger (on either left or right side) for Eredivisie club Volendam.

Club career
Blom played futsal in the Dutch top-tier Eredivisie for ASV Lebo before switching to football. He signed a contract with Volendam on 8 June 2021, initially assigned to their Under-21 squad.

Blom made his professional debut for Volendam on 17 September 2021 in an Eerste Divisie game against VVV-Venlo. For the 2022–23 season, Volendam was promoted to the top-tier Eredivisie. Blom made his Eredivisie debut on 23 October 2022 against Heerenveen.

References

External links
 

2002 births
Footballers from Amsterdam
Living people
Dutch footballers
Dutch men's futsal players
Association football forwards
FC Volendam players
Eredivisie players
Eerste Divisie players
Tweede Divisie players